The 2011 NASCAR Sprint Showdown and Sprint All-Star Race was the 27th running of NASCAR's special non-points race involving winners of the 2010 and 2011 NASCAR Sprint Cup Series races through the 2011 FedEx 400 as well as Sprint All-Star Race 2001–2010 winners, when the event was known as "The Winston" and the "Nextel All-Star Challenge", and past Sprint Cup champions from the decade covering 2001 to 2010, including the "Winston Cup" (2001–2003) and "Nextel Cup" (2004–2007) eras.  The event was run at the  Charlotte Motor Speedway in the Charlotte, North Carolina suburb of Concord on May 21, 2011. Speed provided television coverage in the United States while MRN (over-the-air/terrestrial) and Sirius XM Radio (satellite) had radio rights.

Race format
The format of the race was similar to the 2010 event, broken down as follows:

Segment One - One fifty-lap segment, with a mandatory four-tire green flag pit stop after Lap 25;
Segment Two - One twenty-lap segment, after which pits were open - drivers could opt to have a pit stop, but could sacrifice their position on the track should they choose to do so.
Segment Three - Another twenty-lap segment;
10-Minute Break period -  all cars were allowed to make any adjustments/fuel-except tires;
All cars left the pit after the ten-minute break period, took the green flag, then re-entered the pits for a mandatory four-tire green flag pit stop.
Segment Four - A final ten-lap green flag segment.

The qualifying session for eligible drivers consisted of three laps instead of the standard two, including a pit stop after either of the first two laps, slowing to the speed limit of 45 mph entering pit road, but going full throttle as they exit.

Eligible drivers
The following drivers qualified for the race in these categories:

Past Series Champion drivers
The following five drivers fit into the Past Champions category:
14-Tony Stewart (Three-time series champion, most recently 2011)
22-Kurt Busch (2004 series champion; also defending race champion)
17-Matt Kenseth (2003 series champion)
24-Jeff Gordon (Four-time series champion, most recently 2001)
5-Jimmie Johnson (Seven-time series champion, most recently 2016)

Past All-Star race-winning drivers
The following four drivers are eligible as a past winner of the event in the last decade:
4-Kasey Kahne (Sprint All-Star Race XXIV winner)
29-Kevin Harvick (Sprint All-Star Race XXIII winner)
25-Mark Martin (Sprint All-Star Race XXI winner)
39-Ryan Newman (Sprint All-Star Race XVIII winner)

2010 or 2011 race winners
The following ten drivers are eligible by winning a Sprint Cup points race in 2010 or 2011:
18-Kyle Busch (2010 Irwin Tools Night Race)
11-Denny Hamlin (2010 AAA Texas 500)
1-Jamie McMurray (2010 Brickyard 400)
00-David Reutimann (2010 LifeLock.com 400)
42-Juan Pablo Montoya (2010 Heluva Good! Sour Cream Dips at the Glen)
33-Clint Bowyer (2010 Sylvania 300)
99-Carl Edwards (2010 Kobalt Tools 500 (Phoenix))
16-Greg Biffle (2010 Sunoco Red Cross Pennsylvania 500)
21-Trevor Bayne* (2011 Daytona 500)
78-Regan Smith (2011 Showtime Southern 500)

For those not listed above, a special race, The Sprint Showdown, consisting of two halves of 20 laps [] each was held prior to the main event. The top two finishers and a driver chosen by a fan poll were promoted to the main event:

6-David Ragan (Winner of Sprint Showdown)
2-Brad Keselowski (Runner-up in Sprint Showdown)
88-Dale Earnhardt Jr. (Winner of fan vote)

Only winning drivers, not teams, are eligible to race in the All-Star Race; previously a team could qualify for the race even if the driver who won a race for the team was no longer employed by them.

* - Trevor Bayne was scheduled to run in the All Star Race, but the Wood Brothers team withdrew him due to him still recovering from an illness.

Entry List

Showdown

All-Star Race

* - Jimmie Johnson, who usually runs the #48 car, ran the #5 for Lowe's 5% off purchase on their credit card

** - Mark Martin, who usually runs the #5 car, ran the #25 car as a throwback the first #25 car 25 years ago in 1986 driven by Tim Richmond.

Qualifying

Showdown

All-Star Race

* - Won the Showdown

** - Showdown runner up

*** - Fan Vote winner

Results

Showdown

All-Star Race

Other events

Induction of the 2011 Class to the NASCAR Hall of Fame
The formal inductions for the second class of the NASCAR Hall of Fame, made up of Bobby Allison, Ned Jarrett, Bud Moore, David Pearson, and Lee Petty, was held the day after the race on Sunday, May 22.  This became the last year the inductions will take place in May; beginning in 2012, the ceremonies will be held in January following a June election.

Craftsman All-Star Pit Crew Challenge
The annual Craftsman All-Star Pit Crew Challenge competition was held on the Thursday prior to the race at the Time Warner Cable Arena in Charlotte.  The #11 Joe Gibbs Racing team, led by Mike Ford, won the competition over the #48 of Hendrick Motorsports. As a result, the #11, driven by Denny Hamlin, received the first selection of pit stalls for the All-Star Race.

References

NASCAR Sprint All-Star Race
Sprint All-Star Race
NASCAR races at Charlotte Motor Speedway
NASCAR All-Star Race